Football competitions at the 2022 Bolivarian Games in Valledupar, Colombia were held from 26 June to 4 July 2022 at the Estadio Armando Maestre Pavajeau.

Two medal events were scheduled to be contested: a boys' and women's tournament. A total of 144 athletes (72 per gender and 4 teams per event) will compete in the events. The boys' tournament is restricted to under-17 players while the women's tournament is restricted to under-20 players.

Hosts Colombia, who were the defending gold medalists in both boys' and women's tournaments, managed to retain its title in the women's tournament but failed in the men's event after finishing third. Paraguay won the gold medal in the men's tournament.

Participating nations
A total of 6 nations (4 ODEBO nations and 2 invited) registered teams for the football event. Each nation was able to enter a maximum of 36 athletes (one team of 18 athletes per gender). Hosts Colombia and Paraguay will participate in both events. Bolivia and Dominican Republic will participate in the boys' tournament, while Panama and Venezuela will participate in the women's tournament.

Venue
All matches in both events were played at Estadio Armando Maestre Pavajeau in Valledupar.

Medal summary

Medal table

Medalists

Boys' tournament

The boys' tournament was held from 2 to 4 July 2022 and consisted of a single group of 4 teams in which each team played once against the other 3 teams in the group on a single round-robin basis. The top three teams were awarded gold, silver and bronze medals respectively.

Standings

Matches

Goalscorers

Women's tournament

The women's tournament was held from 26 to 28 June 2022 and consisted of a single group of 4 teams in which each team played once against the other 3 teams in the group on a single round-robin basis. The top three teams were awarded gold, silver and bronze medals respectively.

Standings

Matches

Goalscorers

References

External links
Bolivarianos Valledupar 2022 Football

Football
2022
2022 Bolivarian Games
Bolivarian Games
Bolivarian Games
Bolivarian Games